Setermoen is the administrative centre of Bardu Municipality in Troms og Finnmark county, Norway.

The local council proclaimed city status for Setermoen in 1999, but this was rejected by the government of Norway since the municipality has less than 5,000 inhabitants.

Location
Setermoen is located along the river Barduelva, and on the shores of Sætervatnet lake in the middle of the Bardudalen valley. The European route E6 highway runs right through the center of Setermoen. Both the Bardu Church and the Setermoen military camp are located in Setermoen.

Setermoen Camp
Military education was established at Setermoen in 1898 because of its strategic location in the midst of the mountains, and is one of the oldest army camps in Norway today. In many ways, the Norwegian Armed Forces has shaped Setermoen and the community through its presence.

Altogether, about 1,000 soldiers and 500 officers are stationed here, making it the largest garrison in Norway.  Stationed at Setermoen are the following battalions, which are part of Brigade Nord:
Artilleribataljonen (artillery battalion)
Panserbataljonen (armoured battalion)
Sanitetsbataljonen (medical battalion)
Etteretningsbataljonen (intelligence battalion)

In 2007, the government began a massive renovation program at Setermoen. Most of the main buildings and barracks were torn down and new ones built. The reason for the project was the end of the Cold War and the reorganization of the Norwegian Army from a mere mobilization force into a modern professional force, as this requires a lot more follow-up to the troops and better standards to attract more volunteers.

References

Villages in Troms
Populated places of Arctic Norway
Bardu